Broad City is an American television sitcom created by and starring Ilana Glazer and Abbi Jacobson. It was developed from their independent web series of the same name, which was produced between 2009 and 2011. The sitcom, like the web series, is based on Glazer and Jacobson's real-life friendship, and their attempt to "make it" in New York. The sitcom premiered on Comedy Central on January 22, 2014, and aired for five seasons, ending on March 28, 2019. The show received critical acclaim throughout its run and has been ranked among the best television shows of the 2010s.

Cast

Main cast

 Abbi Jacobson as Abbi Abrams, who was born in 1988 and is from the Philadelphia Main Line. She lives in Astoria, Queens, and is an aspiring artist. She has an alter ego, Val, who only appears when Abbi is black-out drunk.
 Ilana Glazer as Ilana Wexler, a New York University graduate from Long Island. She lives in Gowanus, Brooklyn, and is an extroverted slacker and marijuana enthusiast.

Recurring cast
 Hannibal Buress as Lincoln Rice, DDS – a pediatric dentist with whom Ilana has a casual sexual relationship 
 Paul W. Downs as Trey Pucker – Abbi's boss at Soulstice 
 John Gemberling as Matt Bevers – Abbi's roommate Melody's boyfriend
 Arturo Castro as Jaimé Castro – Ilana's roommate 
 Stephen Schneider as Jeremy Santos – Abbi's across-the-hall neighbor
 Chris Gethard as Todd – Ilana's boss at Deals! Deals! Deals!, a fictional web "deal" company  
 Nicole Drespel as Nicole – Ilana's former co-worker
 Eliot Glazer as Eliot Wexler – Ilana's brother (the actor is Ilana's brother in real life)
 Susie Essman as Bobbi Wexler – Ilana and Eliot's mother who lives on Long Island.
 Bob Balaban as Arthur Wexler – Ilana and Eliot's father who lives on Long Island.
 D'Arcy Carden as Gemma – one of Abbi's co-workers at Soulstice

Episodes

Production

Development of web series 
Glazer and Jacobson met in New York City, where they both attended courses at the Upright Citizens Brigade and were part of a small improv comedy group, Secret Promise Circle. The web series began after Jacobson received poor feedback on a project she and a partner had been working on. Jacobson expressed her frustration to Glazer, and the two decided to work together on a project that became the web series. In February 2010 they started their own web series on YouTube, which proved popular.

Jacobson met Paul W. Downs in improv class and both Jacobson and Glazer met Lucia Aniello through the Upright Citizens Brigade. Both were fans of the web series pilot and Aniello would then direct one episode of the web series. The web series ran for two seasons and the finale starred Amy Poehler.

Development of TV pilot and first season 
Amy Poehler became aware of the series and mentored Glazer and Jacobson, becoming executive producer when the show came to TV. When Glazer and Jacobson wrote the pilot script, their characters were named Evelyn Wexler and Carly Abrams respectively, but ended up using their real first names instead. Poehler, Glazer, and Jacobson went to Los Angeles to pitch the pilot. The show was originally pitched to the FX, who bought the script and passed a year later, due to it being "too girly", according to Jacobson. Comedy Central committed to the show in 2012 and the pilot was developed, with Aniello directing. For the first season, Jacobson and Glazer were paired with Tami Sagher, an experienced showrunner, with Downs, Aniello, and Chris Kelly completing the writing room. Downs and Aniello would also produce the show, with Downs appearing as Trey in the series.

Throughout its run, the show featured notable guest stars including Wanda Sykes, Kelly Ripa, Amy Poehler, Fran Drescher, Shania Twain, Hillary Clinton, and RuPaul. Broad City: High Score, a mobile game developed and published by Built Games, was released on April 20, 2018.

Second season 
After the first season, Glazer and Jacobson parted ways with Sagher and became the showrunners. The second season premiered on January 14, 2015, and was renewed for a third season ahead of the premiere.

Final season 
Glazer and Jacobson decided to end the show after five seasons. Of their final season, Glazer said: "I feel like we've raised these kids, Abbi Abrams and Ilana Wexler, and we're sending them to college", Glazer says. "We didn't want to just go until it got canceled. We wanted to choose to end it so that it could end as strong as possible. We chose this ending to honor the characters." In their final season, Glazer and Jacobson open with an episode that unfolds like a long Instagram story. Throughout the season, the characters go to MoMA as well as drag brunch.

Reception

Critical reception
The show has received critical acclaim. Review aggregation website Metacritic noted that season 1 received "generally favorable reviews", giving it a score of 75 out of 100, based on reviews from 14 critics. Karen Valby from Entertainment Weekly described the show as a "deeply weird, weirdly sweet, and completely hilarious comedy". The Wall Street Journal referred to the show as "Sneak Attack Feminism". Critic Megan Angelo quotes Abbi Jacobson, main star of Comedy Central's Broad City: "If you watch one of our episodes, there's not a big message, but if you watch all of them, I think, they're empowering to women." The A.V. Club critic Caroline Framke wrote that Broad City was "worth watching" despite its "well-trod premise", and that the series is "remarkably self-possessed, even in its first episode." Critics have compared the show to Seinfeld, especially due to the characters' perceived lack of personal development as well as humor involving the minutae of daily life.

Season 1 of the show received a 96% "Certified Fresh" rating from Rotten Tomatoes, based on reviews from 23 critics, with the site's consensus stating, "From its talented producers to its clever writing and superb leads, Broad City boasts an uncommonly fine pedigree." The A.V. Club named Broad City the second best TV show of 2014, Slate named it the best show of the year, and Screen Rant named it the 5th best of the year. The Writers Guild Foundation listed the script for the first season finale "The Last Supper" as one of the best scripts of the 2010s, describing the show as "a benchmark for writing about buddies".

Season 2 received positive reviews, with Metacritic giving it a score of 89 out of 100, based on reviews from eight critics, indicating "universal acclaim". Rotten Tomatoes gave the second season a rating of 100%, based on reviews from 11 critics, with the site's consensus: "Led by two of the funniest women on TV, Broad City uses its stars' vibrant chemistry to lend an element of authenticity to the show's chaotic yet enlightening brand of comedy." Broad City again appeared on end-of-year lists for 2015, placing fifth on Time Outs list and second on Rolling Stones list. Vox named it the 2nd funniest show on television and The Atlantic named "Wisdom Teeth" one of the best episodes of TV that year.

Season 3 received positive reviews as well, with Metacritic giving it a score of 87 out of 100, based on reviews from 8 critics, indicating "universal acclaim". Ben Travers from Indiewire summarizes what he sees as the strengths of the first two episodes of season 3: "Each half-hour feels as free-wheeling and wild as Ilana so boldly is, but also as meticulously put-together as Abby [sic] strives to be ... the integration of its two creators attitudes into the core makeup of the series helps to illustrate how groundbreaking Broad City really is." In 2016, Broad City placed 18th in Complexs best shows of the year, 15th on Den of Geeks list, and 14th on Esquires mid-year list.

Season 4 received positive reviews, with Metacritic giving it a score of 85 out of 100, based on reviews from 5 critics, indicating "universal acclaim". Rotten Tomatoes gave the season a rating of 100%, based on reviews from 23 critics, with the site's consensus: "Pizza and weird are always in season for Abbi and Ilana in their fourth, wintery year of Broad City's weed-infused escapades." NME named Broad City the 20th-best TV show of the year for 2017.

The final season also received positive reviews, with Metacritic giving it a score of 80 out of 100, based on reviews from 5 critics, indicating "generally favourable reviews". Rotten Tomatoes gave the season a rating of 100%, based on reviews from 25 critics, with the site's consensus: "Glazer and Jacobson give the people exactly what they want in Broad Citys final season – relatable content, questionable intimacy, and ingenious escapades through the glorious squalor of IRL NYC." Broad City was named one of the best shows of the year by Junkee and "Stories" was named one of the best TV episodes of the year by Decider.

Broad City appeared on many best of the decade lists for television. Vanity Fair named Broad City the ninth-best show of the decade and Rolling Stone named it the 28th best show of the decade. It was also named the 20th, 34th and 41st best show of the decade, by Junkee, The A.V. Club and Film School Rejects, respectively. The Guardian named Broad City the 96th best TV show of the 21st century. The Advocate named the show the 15th-"Most Important LGBTQ TV Show" of the decade.

The show has been named as an influence on similar shows, such as PEN15 and Tuca & Bertie.

Ratings
The first season of Broad City performed well, averaging 1.2 million viewers per episode, becoming Comedy Central's highest-rated first season since 2012 among the younger demographics, including adults aged 18–34. Despite initial commercial success and ongoing positive critical reviews, by March 2016 the show was receiving well under 1 million viewers, with fewer than 600,000 tuning in during the second week of the month.

Awards and nominations
Broad City has been nominated for several awards; it received five nominations at the Critics' Choice Television Awards, in 2014, where Ilana Glazer was nominated for Best Actress in a Comedy Series, while the series was nominated for Best Comedy Series and in 2015 where both Ilana Glazer and the series were again nominated within the same categories, with an additional nomination for guest star Susie Essman for Best Guest Performer in a Comedy Series The series received three further nominations in 2016 at the Dorian Awards for Unsung TV Show of the Year, the Gold Derby Awards for Best Comedy Series, and the Writers Guild of America Awards for Comedy Series Ilana Glazer and Abbi Jacobson were nominees of the MTV Movie & TV Award for Best Comedic Performance in 2017 Animation director Mike Perry won the Primetime Emmy Award for Outstanding Motion Design in 2018 and in 2019, Comedy Central was awarded The ReFrame Stamp within the Television (2017–2018) category.

Home media

References

External links

  at Comedy Central
 
 
 Broad City (original web series) on YouTube
 Broad City: High Score (video game) (archived)

2014 American television series debuts
2019 American television series endings
2010s American LGBT-related comedy television series
2010s American sex comedy television series
2010s American single-camera sitcoms
American LGBT-related sitcoms
American television series about cannabis
Bisexuality-related television series
Casual sex in television
Comedy Central original programming
Cultural depictions of Hillary Clinton
English-language television shows
Jewish comedy and humor
Television series about Jews and Judaism
Progressivism in the United States
Television duos
Television series based on Internet-based works
Television series by 3 Arts Entertainment
Television series by Paper Kite Productions
Television shows set in New York City
Sitcom web series